The Public Notaries Act 1801 was an Act of Parliament in the United Kingdom that targeted persons acting as public notaries without lawful authority from a court. From 1 August 1801, no person was permitted to be such a notary "unless such person shall have been duly sworn, admitted, and inrolled [sic]". It did not, however, cover such public notaries who worked within religious organisations. It required notaries to serve as an apprentice for seven years prior to appointment, and provided detailed penalties for dishonesty with regard to appointments and qualifications for the position. Several sections of the Act were eventually repealed or overridden by the Courts and Legal Services Act 1990, the Legal Services Act 2007 and the Statute Law Revision Act 1872.

References

United Kingdom Acts of Parliament 1801